Juan Pujol is a town in Argentina, located in the Monte Caseros Department, within the Corrientes Province, and it is the capital of the Municipality of 3rd Category Juan Pujol.

It has 1,487 people inhabitants.

It is named after Governor Juan Gregorio Pujol.

References

Populated places in Corrientes Province